Novoselić is a Croatian surname.  Notable people with the surname include:

 Krist Novoselic, American musician
 Sofija Novoselić, Croatian alpine skier

Novoselic may also refer to:

 The Kingdom of Novoselic, a fictional country in Europe within the Danganronpa universe

See also
 Novosel

Croatian surnames